The following is a list of films shot wholly or partly on the Gold Coast, Queensland, Australia.
The Gold Coast is a popular location for the filming of Hollywood movies and high-budget Australian movies. The City of the Gold Coast has also emerged as a growing hub for independent feature film production between 2009 and 2019 by content creators living and working in the region.

See also 
List of films shot in Queensland

References

External links 
 Film Gold Coast Website
 Village Roadshow Studios Website

Gold Coast
 
Gold Coast, Queensland-related lists
Mass media on the Gold Coast, Queensland